Agardite is a mineral group consisting of agardite-(Y), agardite-(Ce), agardite-(Nd), and agardite-(La).  They comprise a group of minerals that are hydrous hydrated arsenates of rare-earth elements (REE) and copper, with the general chemical formula (REE,Ca)Cu6(AsO4)3(OH)6·3H2O. Yttrium, cerium, neodymium, lanthanum, as well as trace to minor amounts of other REEs, are present in their structure. Agardite-(Y) is probably the most often found representative. They form needle-like yellow-green (variably hued) crystals in the hexagonal crystal system. Agardite minerals are a member of the mixite structure group, which has the general chemical formula Cu2+6A(TO4)3(OH)6·3H2O, where A is a REE, Al, Ca, Pb, or Bi, and T is P or As. In addition to the four agardite minerals, the other members of the mixite mineral group are calciopetersite, goudeyite, mixite,  petersite-(Ce), petersite-(Y), plumboagardite, and zálesíite.

Agardite-(Y) from the Bou Skour mine in Djebel Sarhro, Morocco was the first of the agardite-group minerals to be characterized.  It was described by Dietrich in 1969 and was named after Jules Agard, a French geologist at the Bureau de Recherches Géologiques et Minières, Orléans, France.  Agardite-group minerals have subsequently been found in Germany, Czech Republic, Greece, Italy, Japan, Namibia, Poland, Spain, Switzerland, the United Kingdom, and the United States.

See also
 List of minerals

References

Further reading
 Aufschluss 1977(5), 177–183.
 Steen, H. (2005): Ein Neufund von Agardit-(Y) aus Rotenbach im Feldberggebiet (südlicher Schwarzwald). Der Erzgräber 19, 70–72.
 Wittern: "Mineralfundorte in Deutschland", Schweizerbart (Stuttgart), 2001.*Wittern, A. (1995) Mineralien finden im Schwarzwald.
 Lapis 1985(11), 31–32.
 S. Weiss: "Mineralfundstellen, Deutschland West", Weise (Munich), 1990
 Walenta, K. and Theye, T. (2004): Agardit-(Ce) von der Grube Clara im mittleren Schwarzwald. Aufschluss 55, 17–23. [with analysis of Johann material showing Nd > La].
 Emser Hefte 15(3), 2–40 (1994).
 Heckmann, H. & Schertl, H.-P. (1990): Der Niederbergische Erzbergbau und seine Mineralien. Emser Hefte, 11 (2), 2–40. 
 Pekov, I. V., Chukanov, N. V., Zadov, A. E., Voudouris, P., Magganas, A. and Katerinopoulos, A. (2010) Agardite-(Nd), IMA 2010-056. CNMNC Newsletter No. 7, February 2010, page 30; Mineralogical Magazine, 75, 27–31.
 Pekov, I. V., Chukanov, N. V., Zadov, A. E., Voudouris, P., Magganas, A., Katerinopoulos, A. (2011): Agardite-(Nd), NdCu6(AsO4)3(OH)6·3H2O from the Hilarion Mine, Lavrion, Greece: mineral description and chemical relations with other members of the agardite-zálesíite solid-solution system. Journal of Geosciences, 56, 249–255.
 Ambrino, P., Brizio, P., Ciriotti, M. E., Finello, G., Marello, B. (2009). Minerali della pietra di Luserna. AMI. CD-ROM.
 Piccoli, G. C., Maletto, G., Bosio, P., Lombardo, B. (2007). Minerali del Piemonte e della Valle d'Aosta. Associazione Amici del Museo "F. Eusebio" Alba, Ed., Alba (Cuneo) 607 pp.
 Stara, P., Rizzo, R., Brizzi G., (1993): Sarrabus Miniere e Minerali. Edito a cura dell'EMSA e "varie associazioni mineralogiche", 208 pp.
 Stara, P., Rizzo, R., Tanca, G. A. (1996): Iglesiente e Arburese. Miniere e Minerali. Edito a cura dell'EMSA e "varie associazioni mineralogiche", Volume 2, 192 pp.
 Olmi F., Sabelli C., Santucci, A., Brizzi, G. (1995): I silicati e i vanadati di Ozieri (SS). Rivista Mineralogica Italiana, 2/1995, 145–160.
 Vecchi, F., Rocchetti, I., Gentile, P. (2013): Die Mineralien des Granits von Predazzo, Provinz Trient, Italien. Mineralien-Welt, 24(6), 98–117.
 Ricordo di Cristel Puecher da Roveda; F. Maiello, P. Ferretti; 2009*Rocchetti I., Gentile P. and Ferretti P. (2012): La Miniera di Frattasecca presso Malga Broi (Novaledo, Trentino-Alto Adige). Storia e nuove segnalazioni mineralogiche. Studi Trentini di Scienze Naturali, 92, p. 167–180.
 Bortolozzi G., Blass G., Boscardin M., Rocchetti I. and Ferretti P. (2013): La Miniera di Cinquevalli (Valsugana, Trentino-Alto Adige): aggiornamento sulle specie accertate negli ultimi anni. Studi Trent. Sci. Nat., 93, p. 149–165.
 Paolo Gasparetto, Erica Bittarello, Andrea Canal, Lara Casagrande, Marco E. Ciriotti, Bruno Fassina, Paolo Ferretti, Sergio Pegoraro, Fabio Tosato, Paolo Zammatteo (2014): I lavori minerari del Rio Ricet, Vignola, Falesina, Trento. Micro, 12, 50–123.
 Senesi, F. & Sabelli, C. (1999): Gli arseniati degli antichi scavi di Valle S. Caterina (Campiglia Marittima). Rivista Mineralogica Italiana, 23(1), 51–55.
 The Mineral Species of Japan (5th ed) Matsubara. 
 Yamada, S. (2004) Nihonsan-koubutsu Gojuon-hairetsu Sanchi-ichiranhyou (111 pp.).
 Jimenez R., Joda L., Jorda R., Prado P. (2004) - Madrid: la mineria metallica desde 1417 hasta nuestros dias. Bocamina, n°14, pp: 52–89.
 Tanago, J. G., Lozano, P. L., Larios, A., La Iglesia, A. (2012) Stokesite crystals from La Cabrera, Madrid, Spain. Mineralogical Record 43: 499–508.
 Collection of the Geominero Museum of Madrid; Tanago, J. G., Lozano, P. L., Larios, A., La Iglesia, A. (2012) Stokesite crystals from La Cabrera, Madrid, Spain. Mineralogical Record 43: 499–508. 
 Meisser, N. (2012): La minéralogie de l'uranium dans le massif des Aiguilles Rouges. Matér. Géol. Suisse, Sér. géotech. 96, 183 p.
 Embrey & Symes, 1987, 40 – "Minerals of Cornwall and Devon"]; Peter G. Embrey (1978) Fourth Supplementary List of British Minerals. Mineralogical Magazine 42: 169–177.
 Cooper & Stanley, 1990, 76 – "Minerals of the English Lake district".
 Schultenite: Symes, R.F., Wirth, M., Mineral Mag. (1990), 54, p. 659.
 Mineralien Welt 1/93:44.
 Rocks & Minerals 83:1 pp. 65–69.
 NBMG Spec. Pub. 31 Minerals of Nevada; Rocks & Minerals (2010) 85: 512–524.
 Jensen, M. (1993): Update on the mineralogy of the Majuba Hill mine, Pershing County. Mineralogical Record. 24, 171–180.
 Natural History Museum Vienna collection; Jensen, M. (1993): Update on the mineralogy of the Majuba Hill mine, Pershing County. Mineralogical Record. 24, 171–180.
 R&M 77:5 p. 298–305.
 Anthony, Bideaux, Bladh, Nichols: "Handbook of Mineralogy", Vol. 4, 2000.
 Northrop, Minerals of New Mexico, 3rd Rev. Ed., 1996.
 Micro Probe Volume VI Number 8; Rocks and Minerals, 66:6, p. 453.

External links

RRUFF Project

Calcium minerals
Copper minerals
Lanthanide minerals
Arsenate minerals
Hexagonal minerals
Minerals in space group 176